Sophie Cox (born 1981) is a British judo player from Rochdale, Greater Manchester, England. She represented Great Britain at the 2004 Summer Olympics in Greece.

Judo career
Cox became champion of Great Britain, winning the lightweight division at the British Judo Championships in 2001. The following year she successfully defended her title and won further titles in 2004 and 2005. She also won two silver medals at consecutive European Judo Championships; in the 2004 European Judo Championships in Romania and the 2005 European Judo Championships in the Netherlands. These came after a bronze medal in 2003. Cox temporarily suspended her judo career in 2005.

During this successful period she was selected to represent Great Britain at the 2004 Olympic Games in Greece, competing in the women's 57 kg category she reached the quarter finlas before losing to eventual bronze medallist Kye Sun-hui. She returned to form in 2011, after dropping to half-lightweight. In 2011, she won one of the bronze medals in the 2011 European Judo Championships in Turkey and won her fifth British Championship title.

In 2012, she represented Team GB at the London 2012 Olympic Games, held at ExCeL London, being knocked out in the first round by Kum Ae An who went on to win the gold medal, in the under 52 kg category. She later won her sixth and final British Championship.

Coaching
Cox now coaches judo, judo for BJJ and no-gi grappling as well as training in and competing in Brazilian Jiu-Jitsu. She travels all over the UK and Europe to teach and coach but is mostly based in the North West, Rochdale, Stockport, Manchester and Kendal.

References

Further reading 
 London 2012: Judoka Sophie Cox aims to complete golden return BBC Sport. 30 January 2012.

External links
 
 http://www.judo4all.com

1982 births
English female judoka
Olympic judoka of Great Britain
Living people
Sportspeople from Rochdale
Judoka at the 2004 Summer Olympics
Judoka at the 2012 Summer Olympics
Commonwealth Games medallists in judo
Commonwealth Games bronze medallists for England
Judoka at the 2002 Commonwealth Games
21st-century English women
Medallists at the 2002 Commonwealth Games